Group A was one of the two groups of the 2016 AFF Championship. It consisted of hosts the Philippines, Thailand, Singapore and Indonesia. Play in Group A began on 19 November and ended on 25 November.

Teams

Group standings 

In the semi-finals:
Thailand advanced to play against Myanmar (runners-up of Group B).
Indonesia advanced to play against Vietnam (winners of Group B).

Matches 
All times are in local, Philippines Time (UTC+08:00).

Thailand vs Indonesia

Philippines vs Singapore

Thailand vs Singapore

Indonesia vs Philippines

Singapore vs Indonesia

Philippines vs Thailand

References

External links 
 AFF Suzuki Cup 2016 – Official website

Group stage